Travelers and Thieves is Blues Traveler's second album, released on A&M Records in 1991. The album was released in two different versions: an album-only version, and an extremely limited two-CD pressing.  The bonus disc was called On Tour Forever. On iTunes the album is listed only as Travelers due to the full name being split across two drawings, one on the cover and one inside the CD liner notes.

The liner notes include a poem titled "Of Travelers & Thieves," written by Jonathan Sheehan, brother of bassist Bobby Sheehan.

Track listing
 "The Tiding" (Brendan Hill, Chan Kinchla, John Popper, Bobby Sheehan) – 1:30
 "Onslaught" (Popper, Sheehan) – 6:08
 "Ivory Tusk" (Kinchla, Popper) – 5:15
 "What's for Breakfast" (Popper, Sheehan) – 3:45
 "I Have My Moments" (Kinchla, Popper) – 4:12
 "Optimistic Thought" (Popper) – 3:28
 "The Best Part" (Popper) – 4:49
 "Sweet Pain" (Popper) – 7:41
 "All in the Groove" (Popper) – 4:15
 "Support Your Local Emperor" (Kinchla, Popper, Sheehan) – 6:54
 "Bagheera" (Hill, Kinchla, Popper) – 4:21
 "Mountain Cry" (Hill) – 9:07

Personnel
Blues Traveler
 John Popper – vocals, harmonica, 12-string acoustic guitar, calymba, various barks, squeaks, growls and whistles
 Chan Kinchla – electric guitar, 6-string acoustic guitar
 Bobby Sheehan – bass
 Brendan Hill – drums, percussion
Guest performers
 Gregg Allman – Hammond B3 and vocals on "Mountain Cry"
 Chris Barron – backing vocals on "All in the Groove"

Certifications

References

Blues Traveler albums
1991 albums
A&M Records albums